Peter Erik Norman (born 3 April 1958) is a Swedish economist who served as minister for financial markets from 2010 to 2014. He has a Bachelor of Arts degree. Formerly a non-partisan at the time of his appointment to the government (a rare occurrence in Sweden) he joined Prime Minister Fredrik Reinfeldt's Moderate Party days later. The last Swedish Minister not to be a member of a political party was Sven Romanus, who served as Minister of Justice from 1976 to 1978.

Norman has worked in the financial industry since 1992. The last ten years, before appointment as minister, he has worked as president of the Seventh AP Fund (Swedish: Sjunde AP-fonden). Prior to joining the AP-Fund in 2000, Norman was the CEO of Alfred Berg Asset Management from 1996 to 1999 and director (deputy director) at the Riksbank from 1994 to 1996. 

Norman has previously been chairman of the board of Carnegie Investment Bank and the finance company Max Matthiessen. He is a member of the board of Stockholm University and the investment company Svolder, and was previously vice chairman of the Nuclear Waste Fund.

Following the 2014 defeat, he announced that he would be leaving politics.

References

Richard Gröttheim tillförordnad vd Seventh AP Fund, 5 October 2010 (Swedish)
Nya ministrar får godkänt av näringslivet Svenska Dagbladet, 6 October 2010 (Swedish)
Peter Norman gör raketkarriär i politiken Dagens Nyheter, 5 October 2010 (Swedish)
CV – Peter Norman Regeringskansliet (Swedish)

External links
 

1958 births
Living people
Moderate Party politicians
21st-century Swedish politicians
Swedish Ministers for Finance